Zdeněk Vítek (born 25 July 1977) is a Czech former biathlete. Vítek retired from the sport at the end of the 2013–14 season. In May 2014, he was named as the head coach for the Czech Republic's women biathlon team. After four years in this role, in June 2018 Vitek became head coach of the Czech men's team.

Biathlon results
All results are sourced from the International Biathlon Union.

Olympic Games

*Pursuit was added as an event in 2002, with mass start being added in 2006.

World Championships
1 medal (1 bronze)

*During Olympic seasons competitions are only held for those events not included in the Olympic program.
**Team was removed as an event in 1998, and mass start was added in 1999 with the mixed relay being added in 2005.

Individual victories
1 victory (1 In)

*Results are from UIPMB and IBU races which include the Biathlon World Cup, Biathlon World Championships and the Winter Olympic Games.

References

External links
 
 

1977 births
Living people
People from Vrchlabí
Czech male biathletes
Biathletes at the 1998 Winter Olympics
Biathletes at the 2002 Winter Olympics
Biathletes at the 2006 Winter Olympics
Biathletes at the 2010 Winter Olympics
Olympic biathletes of the Czech Republic
Biathlon World Championships medalists
Czech sports coaches
Cross-country skiing coaches
Sportspeople from the Hradec Králové Region